Friedhelm Brusniak (born 1 October 1952) is a German music educator

Life 
After graduating from high school, he studied school music at the Frankfurt University of Music and Performing Arts from 1971. His teachers were Branka Musulin and Poldi Mildner (piano), Richard Rudolf Klein (sound composition) and Helmuth Rilling (choir direction). He studied musicology with Lothar Hoffmann-Erbrecht and Ludwig Finscher as well as history at the Goethe University Frankfurt. In 1975/77, he passed the First Staatsexamen for teaching at grammar schools. In 1980, he was awarded a Dr. phil. He completed his practical training at the Studienseminar Kassel I (Gymnasium Bad Arolsen). After the Second State Examination in 1980 he was promoted from 1981 to 1988 then  at the Chair of Musicology of the University of Augsburg (Franz Krautwurst). In 1988/89, he received a habilitation scholarship from the Deutsche Forschungsgemeinschaft.

Brusniak habilitated in 1998 at the University of Augsburg for Musicology and was appointed a Privatdozent.<ref>habilitation thesis: Beginnings of amateur choral singing in Bavarian Swabia.</ref> In 1999, he was appointed to the professorship for music education and didactics of music education at the University of Würzburg, where he was also appointed first Chair holder for music education in 2004. Since 2010, he has been Scientific Director of the Foundation Documentation and Research Centre of the German Choral Industry. From 2010 to 2012, he was project manager "German Choral Studies". From 2011 to 2015, he held a guest professorship at the Akademia Pomorska w Słupsku. He retired on 1 April 2019. Since 2018, he has been president of the Franconian Singers' Association.

 Awards 
 Silver Mozart Medal of the International Mozarteum Foundation (2003).
 Auszeichnung der Akademia Pomorska w Słupsku (2015).

 Further reading 
 Brusniak, Friedhelm, in : Verfasserlexikon zur Studenten- und Hochschulgeschichte.'' SH-Verlag, Cologne 2004, . .

References

External links 
 
 Schriftenverzeichnis
 Pommersche Akademie in Słupsk

German music educators
Academic staff of the University of Augsburg
Academic staff of the University of Würzburg
1952 births
Living people
People from Korbach